Somogyvámos is a village in Somogy county, Hungary. It is about 25 km north of Kaposvár, and about 25 km south of Fonyód.

History
The surrounding lands were inhabited since the Avaric rule (6th/7th century). Its first written mention is from 1237, as "Csopak", which is now a name of a different town about 80–100 km away. The village was destroyed during the Ottoman rule and was inherited by the neighbouring village "Vámos", hence the current name, with the "Somogy" prefix, to distinguish it from the other "-vámos" named places. Vámos had slowly "moved" to the current place it lies and sometime in history changed its name to Somogyvámos.

The beauty of the local environment attracted the Hungarian "Hare Krishnas", the local branch of the International Society for Krishna Consciousness and bought lands in the neighbouring valley in the 1990s, where they built up the "Krishna Valley Indian Cultural Centre and Biofarm".

See also
Krisna-völgy Indiai Kulturális Központ és Biofarm

External links
 Official homepage of Somogyvámos
 Street map (Hungarian)

References 

Populated places in Somogy County
Romanesque architecture in Hungary